Mokrousovsky (masculine), Mokrousovskaya (feminine), or Mokrousovskoye (neuter) may refer to:
Mokrousovsky District, a district of Kurgan Oblast, Russia
Mokrousovsky (rural locality), a rural locality (a settlement) in Kemerovo Oblast, Russia